Kalmazan (Qalmaźan) is a rural locality (a village) in Bolsheshadinsky Selsoviet, Mishkinsky District, Bashkortostan, Russia. The population was 87 as of 2010. There is 1 street.

Geography 
Kalmazan is located 22 km northwest of Mishkino (the district's administrative centre) by road. Malye Shady is the nearest rural locality.

References 

Rural localities in Mishkinsky District